The Mercedes-Benz OM366 is a 6.0 liter (5,958cc) Straight-6 (I6) Overhead Valve (OHV) diesel engine with 2 valves per cylinder. It is related to the Straight-4 OM364 engine which has two cylinders chopped off, while the bore and stroke remain unchanged.

It launched in 1983 and had a direct injection system (inline fuel pump) to deliver fuel to every cylinder. It used a twin-scroll turbocharger that was giving ~0.6-0.8atm of boost.

See also 
List of Mercedes-Benz engines

References 

OM366